Senen is an administrative village in the Senen district of Indonesia. It has postal code of 10410.

See also 
 Senen
 List of administrative villages of Jakarta

References 

Administrative villages in Jakarta